Zaduszniki may refer to the following villages in Poland:
Zaduszniki, Kuyavian-Pomeranian Voivodeship (north-central Poland)
Zaduszniki, Subcarpathian Voivodeship (south-east Poland)